Alder Creek Grove  is a giant sequoia grove located both on private land and within the Giant Sequoia National Monument in the western Sierra Nevada of California. Though on private land, the Rouch family made part of their land accessible to the public.

History
In 1946, much of Alder Creek Grove was purchased by the Rouch family to be logged and developed. The grove was logged in the late 1940s and early 1950s. However, doing so proved to be uneconomical due to the brittle nature of giant sequoia wood, and the regret the family felt logging them. Though about two dozen giant sequoias were cut down, no especially large or old giant sequoias were harmed.

A 236-lot subdivision of mostly summer cabins, called Sequoia Crest, was built next to the grove around the same time so people could visit the Stagg Tree and some of the surrounding giant sequoias. A short-lived ski resort was also established to make the land more profitable for the Rouch family.

On September 17, 2019, the Save the Redwoods League announced it had agreed to pay the Rouch family $15.6 million by December 31 to formally protect the giant sequoias growing on their land, including the Stagg Tree. Once the deal is finalized, the League plans to spend another $4.75 million on ecosystem studies and restoration work before handing the grove over to the U.S. Forest Service to be incorporated into Giant Sequoia National Monument. It will then become the largest giant sequoia on land managed by the U.S. Forest Service, edging out the Boole Tree of Converse Basin Grove, the current largest on forest service land.

On December 31, 2019, the Alder Creek Sequoia Grove was saved. Over 8,500 donors from all US States and all major continents minus Antarctica donated the 15.6 million dollars through Save the Redwoods League.  These funds were raised in a space of less than 6 months. Save the Redwoods League plans to retain the Alder Creek property for a period of 5–10 years. During this time restoration, thinning (not thinning sequoias), and fire will help restore landscape features in this unique sequoia grove. Once complete the Alder Creek property will be transferred to the US Forest Service for inclusion into the Giant Sequoia National Monument.

In September 2020, the high-intensity Castle Fire swept through the grove.

Description
Alder Creek Grove is remarkably diverse, being made up of trees of many different ages and sizes, from seedlings to 3,000-year-old giants. There are also mature stands of red fir, white fir, ponderosa pine, and sugar pine trees mixed in amongst the giant sequoias. The grove is also home to several meadows, wetlands, and lush riparian woodlands.

Noteworthy trees

The tree was discovered in 1960 and named after Amos Alonzo Stagg, an American athlete and college coach in multiple sports. The tree is located on private property, but anyone is allowed to visit the tree if they park where signed and walk the  trail to the tree.
The immense basal buttress of the tree supported it as it grows along the steep southern bank of South Alder Creek. It was destroyed in the Castle Fire of 2020. Several seeds had previously been collected from Waterfall and have since been replanted in the same area.
Window: a giant sequoia which featured a large "window" that was formed when the tree was weakened by disease and later struck by lightning. This tree was also destroyed by the Castle Fire.

See also
List of giant sequoia groves

References

External links
 
Save the Redwoods efforts to protect Alder Creek

Giant sequoia groves
Giant Sequoia National Monument
Protected areas of Tulare County, California
Sequoia National Forest